Bucinișu, composed of two villages, Bucinișu and Bucinișu Mic, is a small commune in Olt County in the region of southern Oltenia, Romania. It has mainly developed throughout the time on the practice of agriculture. 

Its name draws its origin from a sound instrument used by the drovers that would tend their flocks of sheep in that region, an instrument called "bucium" or "bucin".

References

Communes in Olt County
Localities in Oltenia